Core is an American stoner rock band from New Jersey, formed in the late 1990s.

Biography
Core debuted with their first album, Revival, in 1996 on Atlantic Records. The album was produced by Billy Anderson and supported by tours with Fu Manchu, Clutch and Orange 9mm. Despite this publicity, the album suffered due to limited promotion. The band bounced back in 1999 with their follow up, The Hustle Is On on MIA Records and Tee Pee Records. It features artwork by Arik Roper. The album was supported by a tour entitled "Riff Rock Railroad", which also featured Atomic Bitchwax and Nebula.

In addition to the two albums, Core was also featured on the MeteorCity Records compilation Welcome to Meteor City, an album that showcased numerous Kyuss-like bands and helped establish MeteorCity. They also contributed "Soul Shaker" (a cover of Aerosmith's "Soul Saver") to the Small Stone Records tribute compilation Right in the Nuts.

Members
Finn Ryan – vocals, guitar
Carmine Pernini – bass
Tim Ryan – drums

Discography

Studio albums
Revival (1996 Atlantic Records)
The Hustle Is On (1999 MIA Records/Tee Pee Records

Compilation album appearances
"Rallen" on Kill the Rock Star (1996 TARR Records)
"Vacuum Lite" on Welcome to Meteor City (1997 MeteorCity Records)
"Soul Shaker" on Right in the Nuts: A Tribute to Aerosmith (2000 Small Stone Records)
"Fleetwood" on Guerrilla Jukebox Vol 1 (2003 Tee Pee Records)

References

External links
Core at MySpace
[ Core] at Allmusic

Rock music groups from New Jersey
American stoner rock musical groups
Musical groups established in 1996